Sacred Heart School is a private, Catholic high school in East Grand Forks, Minnesota. It is located in the Roman Catholic Diocese of Crookston.

Sacred Heart was established in 1912 and is the only Catholic high school in northwest Minnesota. Sacred Heart School also serves northeast North Dakota.

Sacred Heart School is located at 200 3rd Street NW, East Grand Forks, MN 56721.

Background, Founding and establishment
The first attempt to have a Catholic school in East Grand Forks began in 1895 when the Sisters of St. Benedict, Duluth, Minnesota, started a school and hospital.  Father Hendrick, the first pastor of Sacred Heart, requested the Sisters start a mission at East Grand Forks. Mother Scholastica purchased a three-story wooden building called the Acme House to be used as a school, hospital, and convent.  The building was located at the present southern intersection of Business Highway 2 East and 220 North.

The second and third floors of the building housed the hospital.  The school was organized immediately afterward, opening in the fall of 1895.  Staffing the school in 1895 were Sister James and Sister Gertrude as teachers and Sister Josephine as the first music teacher.

The name of the school is unclear by different accounts, being called either Sacred Heart School or St. Joseph's School (same name as the hospital).  The school appeared to have had a full capacity considering the small size of the East Grand Forks community at that time.
During the first year of operation of the school, the newly built church of Sacred Heart was destroyed by fire on December 1, 1895.  Rev. Hendrick immediately began to raise funds to rebuild the church.  Sister Josephine recounted the following story:
“Soon after Christmas, Mother Scholastica came to the mission at East Grand Forks and the next evening, Father Hendrick paid a courtesy visit to the convent.  The conversation turned upon the burning of his church and the campaign he was conducting to raise building funds.

“When one of the sisters casually proposed a St. Patrick’s Day program by the children and the private music class as a moneymaking project for the church, everyone including Reverend Mother, agreed to the proposal.
“Accordingly a month or so before the 17th of March, practicing was in order, every evening after school and on Saturdays.  The year 1895 was in the pre-radio, pre-movie, pre-television age when parish-school entertainment was a big event.
“The sisters prepared a program of choruses, fancy drills, players, individual readings, and other features so that every pupil of the school might have a part.  The parish sewing circle made a galaxy of costumes; the pastor had the tickets printed free-of-charge and the men sold them.
“Not only were the children and the teachers busy, the whole parish was agog.  The sale of tickets was so large that no hall in East Grand Forks could accommodate the crowd which was expected.  Father Hendrick rented the Opera House in Grand Forks, agreeing that the management should have 30% of the sales, the remainder was to be given to the church fund.
“Just before the time to raise the curtain, Father Hendrick, very pale, came upon  the platform, a letter in his hand and announced to the audience that the entertainment had to be postponed, that it would be presented in East Grand Forks free-of-charge before vacation, and that the admission fee would be refunded at the door when the audience was going out.
“Only one person wanted a refund.  The free entertainment took place in the basement of the new church, which was completed the second week of June.  Apparently some mistake in clerical or parish etiquette has occurred, and the pastor of the other parish had objected.”

It seems from another account that Father Hendrick had failed to notify the Grand Forks Catholic pastor who protested to his Bishop (Grand Forks being in another diocese than East Grand Forks).  In turn, the Bishop of Duluth was contacted and Father Hendrick was prohibited from following through with the music program in Grand Forks.
The school continued in the hospital building until March 1898 or 1899 when it was moved to the basement of the rebuilt church.  Sister Seraphica Karp's diary revealed what her first mission was like:

“The next two days were spent in getting the schoolrooms ready for use.  The school is extremely poor for a 19th century school.  There are two large rooms in the basement of the church with the furnace room between.  The rafters of the church floor from the ceiling and the walls are bare brick walls, whitewashed.  The windows are low, the whole a dirty, damp and misty place.  It was the most dreary-looking schoolroom I had ever seen.  But we had it all looking clean and nice within a day, as it could be made without any expense.

Wednesday, September 2, dawned bright and clear.  We ha[d] mass at the church at 8 a.m.  I went to school and some of the children were there already, looking as bright and happy as could be!  Sister knew them all, and I tried to remember their names but did not succeed, as there were too many new things all at once to be remembered.
“The first day I had about 20 children from five to 10-years-old, and among them were two Chinese boys with their hair braided from the middle of the back of the head.  The older was about seven and the younger about five or six.  They had never been to school, but were as bright as new dollars.  What amused me so much was that they invariably made figures and letters back to front.”

Students who attended this school and recalled their memories in the “Echoes of 25 Years,” were Eulalia Forkey, Nellie Racine, Bessie Mongoven, Nora Tessier, Nellie Liston, Mary Liston, Flora Jackson, Ida Greenwood, Barbara Martin, Clara Martin, Bernie McGrave, Wallace Forkey, John Greenwood, Mike Liston, Ernie Sullivan, Art Keller, Irene Floidy, Etta Sullivan, Lillian Sullivan, Jack Mongoven, Henry Mongoven, Mary Sullivan, Mary Ryan, Harriet McGuire, Ruby Coons, Nellie Donovan, Laura Sullivan, Josephine Sullivan, Barbara Koch, Jennie Liston, Clara Sullivan, Mary Rider, Minnie Steinbar, William Steinbar, Ella Forkey, Leo Dunlevy, Marie Dunlevy, Sophie Tessier, Tref Tessier, Lila Craig, Earl Lynch, Earl Racine, and Fredie Enright.  Other students attended the school but no records exist other than what names were recalled at the 25th Reunion of Sacred Heart in 1937.

One of the students, Eulalia Forkey, later became Rev. Mother M. Monica, O.S.B., prioress of the Sisters of St. Benedict, Crookston, Minn.  Her father was a lumberman in the French settlement south of East Grand Forks.  The family moved to East Grand Forks so that Eulalia could continue her education.

She entered the eighth grade about 1897.  She recalled that Sister Josephine taught dramatics and was the idol of the young girls. “Lily got a trouncing for commenting under her breath to a girlfriend that, ‘Sister Josephine should have been an actress.’”

The parochial school was established in the basement of the church.  It consisted of three sunny rooms.  The sisters, meanwhile lived in the little hospital then in the town.”  (The Woman of the Strong Heart by Theresa Scholand, page 7).
Sacred Heart School was closed after the 1900 school year.  The Sisters of Duluth decided to withdraw their mission from East Grand Forks.  Although support was strong from the pastors and parish to build a Catholic school, it would take 12 years before it would happen.

When Father William Klinkhammer was appointed pastor in 1911, he immediately planned the building of the new Sacred Heart School.  Construction started in the fall of 1911 and was completed for the first classes in the fall of 1912.  The three-story, dark brown brick building stood between the auditorium and convent on Third Street N.W.  Frank Wurzbacher, a member of the first graduating class, distinctly recalled his pride in having helped place the Sacred Heart statue in its niche above the porch balcony.  The school at first consisted of grades one through eight.

The teaching staff was provided once again by the Sisters of St. Benedict from Duluth.  Sister M. Hyacinthe, O.S.B. was principal for the first year but was replaced by Sister Aquina due to failing health.  Sister Josepha replaced her and remained until 1918.  Sister Josepha first began the high school department, which for a few years consisted of only a two-year course.

1918-1952
At that time, a high school education was difficult for many students because it was deemed not as necessary.  That is why many students left school after eighth grade and worked on the home farm full-time.

Members of the first eighth grade graduating class of 1913 were Marie Bowes, Ralph Carney, Rosella Carney, Amelia Crystal, Francis Driscoll, Alveretta Enright, Edward Enright, Bernard Kelly, Edward Ketter, Josephine Kingman, Marie LaBarge, Adorine McCoy, Franham Murphy, Genevieve Murphy, Cecelia O’Leary, Irene Powers, Frank Sullivan, Willard Sullivan and Frank Wurzbacher.  The class colors were old-rose and silver gray, and motto was “Ever Upward and Onward”.

It is noted in the 1937 Reunion Book that “having sisters as teachers was a novelty.  Having recess was another–[students] departed in all directions, and returned as it occurred to them to do so.  Recess was discontinued, and the new pupils [were] instructed in 1913 [on the] rules of etiquette, with such good effect that 19 still living are among Uncle Sam’s most law-abiding citizens.”

In 1919, the direction and staffing of the schools was taken over by the Sisters of St. Benedict of Crookston, a new mother house formed from the Benedictines of Duluth.  That year, Sacred Heart organized its first freshman class.  A new grade was added each year until 1923, when the first senior class of six students graduated from the high school.
Those first graduates of the high school division were Lawrence Butler, Michael Harrick, Alice McCoy, Leona O’Neil, Roland Roberts and Louis Sullivan.  Their class flower was the American beauty rose, colors were blue and burnt orange, and the motto was “Build for Character, Not for Fame.”

Leona O’Neil was valedictorian of the class.  Other members of the class who did not finish high school due to work obligations, religious commitments and other reasons were Frederick Borchers, Madonna Carney, Jerome Enright, Veronica Kane, Lillian Keller, Laura Kelly, Josephine Lickteig, Gertrude Powers, Albert Roberts, Aileen Sullivan, Vincent Sullivan and Elizabeth DeGagne.

Stories and memories of the old Sacred Heart Academy have a very special place in the hearts and minds of its graduates.  Once such story about a senior of the class of 1924 claims that he “doubted the adequacy of his Sacred Heart School training by the time he came to graduate, for they say that when a senior, he one day dangled the flapping sole of his shoe out the office window as the ranks were coming in, calling down to the children to observe the condition of his ‘sole’ after 12 years spent in Sacred Heart School.”  The story does not tell why he was in the office.  The student's name was Frank Ketter, who was later ordained a priest in 1933.

1952-1985
By 1952, 409 students had graduated, and a full high school course was maintained.  By that year, however, space had become short as expanding enrollment made demands on classroom facilities.  The crowded condition was relieved in 1952 with the erection of a high school building next to the 1912 building.  The undertaking was under the guidance of Father A.I. Merth, who became pastor of Sacred Heart Parish in 1947 following the death of Msgr. Klinkhammer.  It had been the dying wish of Msgr. Klinkhammer that enlarged and modern facilities for the schools be built, along with a new church building.

A Finance committee had been formed as early as 1948 to formulate plans for the project.  Members of the committee were John P. Bushee, chairman; Leo J. Herrick, Charles E. King, J. James Powers, and Albert Boushey.  Also at this time a building fund drive was started, and by the end of 1949, the fund had grown to approximately $200,000.

The committee entered into a contract with Ursa Louis Freed, an architect from Aberdeen, S.D.  Through the summer of 1949, the Planning Committee was busy going over drawings submitted by the architect, and a booklet containing the drawings of the entire project was prepared.  Members of the Planning Committee were Charles Hertweck, Earl Enright, George Bushee Sr., Edward Ketter, Leonard Driscoll, Frank Barnard, John Cameron Sim, John Bushee, James Kelleher, Frank Zejdlik and John Greenwood.

Money continued to be a problem, and in late 1949 and early 1950, the Building Fund Drive was given a thorough reorganization,  but the parishioners and community responded and, in April 1950, the overall plans were sent out to contractors. On May 5, major bids of over $600,000 were awarded.  The efforts of many groups went into the funding drive, including the students who raised money using certain walls of the project as their goal.

Two damaging floods and the lack of building materials caused by the Korean War delayed the project until the fall of 1950.  The auditorium was built on the site of the old church and was used for the graduation exercises for the class of 1951.  On January 7, 1952, grades 7 through 12 moved into the new high school building.  The new school and church were officially dedicated on Monday, March 31, 1952 by Bishop Francis J. Schenk.

Enrollment in the high school increased following the transition to the new facility, particularly in the 1950s and early 1960s.  The high school population for grades 9 through 12 grew from 148 in 1956 to 270 in 1966.  This enrollment began to decrease somewhat in 1972, as there were 250 students in high school that year.

A new grade school building was built in 1958 on Fourth Street.  The seventh and eighth grades were moved to the new building from the high school. The two rooms they occupied in the high school were used by parish organizations and later as classrooms in 1963 and 1964.

The physical expansion permitted by the new building prompted the faculty to make applications for accreditation with the University of Minnesota.  Accreditation was first granted in 1954 and has been continually renewed.  The grade school was accredited in 1986, one of the early Catholic elementary schools in Minnesota to do so.  In recent years, the new accrediting association is the Minnesota Nonpublic School Accreditation Association in St. Paul.
The first school board was elected in 1963.  The members were Robert Zavoral, Robert Campbell, John Gaddie, Raymond Stocker, John Cook and Michael O’Leary.

In the early years of the school's history, the course of studies for high school students included four years of religion, four years of English, three years of social studies, two to four years of mathematics, three or four years of science and two years of Latin.  In the 1930s, bookkeeping and typing were introduced.  In 1952, shorthand and secretarial training were added. The new building also made the introduction of home economics and industrial arts possible.

In 1985, the Interim Program was developed at Sacred Heart School for grades 7 through 12.  At that time, the program created a two-week interim between trimesters during the school year. This program was originally directed by Bonnie Andrys.  Students were allowed to take two elective classes, one morning and one afternoon, from such offerings as women's studies, design and engineering, computer literacy, drama, ballroom dance, cabinetry, welding, chemistry in agricultural research, etc.  This cooperative program with community leaders and volunteers enabled Sacred Heart to have an innovative curriculum greatly expanding the learning possibilities for students.

Sports at Sacred Heart
Sacred Heart has offered a number of sports throughout its history largely through the support of a dedicated Athletic Association, formerly the Men's Club.  This Association, for example, provided the equipment for the 1952 gymnasium at the cost of $6,000.  Although their budget has grown greatly over the years, they continue to enthusiastically support the sports program entirely.  Today, the Athletic Association must raise over $100,000 annually.  This group of dedicated parents and friends of Sacred Heart raise the money with game passes, concession stand sales, vending, gym signs, sponsors, the annual dinner and social, and Fish Fries.  The Athletic Club Fish Fries have become an area tradition that today serves 800 to 900 every Friday during the Lenten season.  The work crews are made up the various sports teams and their parents each working a different Friday.

The Athletic Association also sponsors a sports Hall of Fame recognizing various individuals and teams.  The honorees are recognized during homecoming week of the football season.  These honorees have been chosen based upon their high school or college accomplishments and/or their efforts to help the school's athletic programs.  Recipients  have been:
1993 – Cheri Fontaine ‘79, Julian “Curly” Gasperlin, Dan Neppel ‘60, Joe Raymond ‘54, Frank Senger;
1994 – Robert “Bob” Zavoral, Brad Kerr ‘73, Katie Rasmussen ‘84, Jim Brinkman;
1995 – Fr. Stan Bourassa, Dick Kotrba ’58, Dennis Marek ‘66;
1996 – Mike Hervey ‘75, Jim Kelleher ‘33;
1997 – no recipients due to flood;
1998 – Jodi Coauette ’93, Jack Gaddie ’46, Dennis Demers ’66, Dave Norton;
1999 – Monsignor A. I. Merth, Ralph Vonasek ’56, Tom Langer ’92;
2000 – Ben Brickson ’93, Marla Carter ’93, Patrick Quirk ‘67;
2001 – Jerome Krejci ‘49, Mike O’Leary ‘48, Nancy Rolczynski ‘86, John Zavoral, ’79;
2002 – Christopher Meyer ‘95, Kristi Wavra ‘92;
2003 – Fr. Bill Mehrkens, Sandy Ripp ’79, Tom Senger ’69;
2004 – 1964 Undefeated Football Team;
2005 – Gary Senger ‘70, Kerry Stinar ‘00;
2006 – R. J. Zavoral and Sons;
2007 – 1957 Football Team;
2008 – Dan Cariveau ‘71, Matthew Marek ‘02;
2009 – 1977 and 1978 Undefeated Football Teams;
2010 – Mike Marek ‘70, Steve Gust.

School Development Program
Recognizing the need for a systematic, long-range program of planning to insure the development and future of Sacred Heart Schools, Father Jerry Rogers started the school’s Development Program in 1982.  It is involved in the raising of funds, endowment oversight, scholarship growth, recruitment and public relations. The present director is Michelle Kraft.  Past directors include Rob Horken, Eleanor Ogaard, and Amy Kliniske.   The Development Office is responsible for various fundraising activities such as the Rake-a-thon; Calendar Raffle; Scrip; Annual Drives with the parish, business, and alumni; and the Spring Fling.  The Spring Fling has grown in size the past few years doubling to recent totals of $100,000.  A new project has been the school’s golf scramble in early September raising $20,000 with over one hundred participants.  Development is more than fundraising as its purpose is to grow an understanding of what Catholic education is and support for within the community.
The high school has recently had an increase in foreign exchange students and a large number of Korean students.
The high school also added in recent years baseball and softball for grades seven through twelve.
Other improvements to the school include a complete automation of the library and updating the computer labs as well as staff computers.  The elementary school has incorporated a new technology program.  In 2009, the school started a new parents association called “Parents Getting Involved” (PGI).  The purpose of PGI is to assist the Development program with its various activities as well as building support for the teachers and staff.
The school's preschool program has grown greatly first starting at a four-year-old program (Little Saints) starting in 1993 then adding a three-year-old program (Little Angels) later.  Its enrollment has doubled and then doubled again with current waiting lists.  The program is licensed by the State of Minnesota.
Daycare was added to the school program in 1999 with the new building.  This program is also licensed by the State and has been in demand with a long waiting list.

Lumen Christi
Lumen Christi was developed to recognize alumni, staff, and friends who have had distinguished careers and/or have served Sacred Heart in a significant way.  Every other year, the honorees receive recognition at an October banquet.  Past recipients were:
Monsignor Klinkhammer
 Monsignor A. I. Merth
 Lois Zavoral
 James “Jim” Kelleher
 Keith Driscoll
 Daniel A. Whalen
 Fr. Jerry Rogers
 Monsignor Tim McGee
 Eleanor Ogaard
 James “Jim” Powers
 Rosie O’Leary
 Sister Marguerite Streifel
 Sister Cornelia Gust
 Sister Mary Jean Gust
 Mona Feist
 Raymond Stocker
 Sister Nancy Boushey
 Robert “Bob” Campbell
 Mary Ann Laxen
 Eldon Zeller
 Barbara Langer
 Beverly LeTexier
 Sister Basil Le Duc
The basic purpose of Sacred Heart Schools since 1921, as with any other Catholic school, is the promotion of the Catholic faith to the youth while creating community and learning of the highest quality.  While the teaching staff has changed from primarily the teaching sisters to lay teachers and the buildings have changed, the philosophy has not.  Current teachers at Sacred Heart include many former graduates of Sacred Heart and other Catholic high schools who continue the tradition of high quality Catholic education in East Grand Forks.

Principals
Principals of first Catholic School
Sister Gertrude, 1899
Sister M. Catherine, 1899-1900
Sacred Heart Principals include:
Sister M. Hyacinthe, 1912-1913
Sister Aquina 1913-1914
Sister Josepha, 1914-1919
Sister Thecla, 1919-1923
Sister Milburga, 1923-1925
Sister Humilitas, 1925-1930
Sister Cyprian, 1930-1934
Sister Adrian, 1934-1936
Sister Emmanual, 1936-1937
Sister Rose, 1937-1939
Sister Adrian, 1939-1946
Sister Mary John Flynn, 1946-1947
Sister Mary Joseph, 1947-1952
High School:
Sister Marcella, 1952-1957
Sister Bernarda, 1957-1971
Sister Joan LaCoursiere, 1971-1978
Sister Basil LeDuc, 1978-1986
Mr. Phillip E. Meyer, 1986-2013
Mr. Carl Adolphson, 2013–2014 (Now School President)
Mr. Dave Andrys, 2014-2016
Mr. Blake Karas, 2017–Present
Elementary (Grade School):
Sister M. Helen, 1954-1964
Sister Hyacinthe, 1964-1968
Sister Mary Jean Gust, 1968-1979
Mr. David Andrys, 1979–2016
Mrs. Jodi Vanderheiden 2016–2017
Ms. Joanne Wilson 2017–Present

Notable alumni

Matthew "Crunch" Marek - College Baseball Player. National Defensive Player of the Year as a Catcher.

Matthew Michael Marek is the son of Michael and Julie Marek, and is the oldest of four children. His father played baseball for the University of North Dakota while his Uncle Dennis Marek played football for North Dakota. Born May 31, 1984 in Grand Forks, N.D. He is now married with one daughter; he resides in a northern suburb of Minneapolis/St Paul. 

Notes

External links
Sacred Heart High School website

Catholic secondary schools in Minnesota
Schools in Polk County, Minnesota
Greater Grand Forks
Educational institutions established in 1911
Private middle schools in Minnesota
Roman Catholic Diocese of Crookston
1911 establishments in Minnesota